Pamela Greer is a British actress, who is best known for her roles on television during the 1960s. In 1966, she changed her name to Luanshya Greer and became a writer for TV shows including Dixon of Dock Green, Thriller and Triangle.

Her television credits include:
 Z-Cars (6 episodes) as WPC Shepherd
 Softly, Softly
 Doctor Who (in the serial The Daleks' Master Plan) as "Lizan"
 The Likely Lads ("Last of the Big Spenders")
 No Hiding Place as "Sheila Laurence"
 Riviera Police

Selected filmography
 They Came from Beyond Space (1967) as Girl Attendant
 The Set Up (1963) as Sally
 Candidate for Murder (1962) (Edgar Wallace Mysteries)

Personal life
She was married to actor John Carson. They had two children; Carson died in 2016.

References

External links
 

Year of birth missing (living people)
20th-century British actresses
British women screenwriters
Living people
Place of birth missing (living people)
British television writers
British women television writers
20th-century British women writers
20th-century British screenwriters